Scherzer is a surname, and may refer to:

 Ernst Scherzer, German writer, pseudonym of Christian August Gottlob Eberhard (1769–1845)
 Johann Gottfried Scherzer, Austrian musical instrument maker (e.g. Contraguitar)
 Karl von Scherzer (1821–1903), Austrian explorer
 Max Scherzer (born 1984), American baseball pitcher
 Otto Scherzer (1909–1982), German theoretical physicist
 Steffi Scherzer (born 1957), German ballet dancer
 William Donald Scherzer, American engineer (known for the "Scherzer"-system of Bascule bridges)
 Julius Scherzer (born 1928), Romanian chemist

German words and phrases
German-language surnames
Jewish surnames
Surnames from nicknames
Occupational surnames